The Vanur block is a revenue block in the Viluppuram district of Tamil Nadu, India. It has a total of 65 panchayat villages.

References 
 

Revenue blocks of Villupuram district